Slow Beau is a 1930 short animated film distributed by Columbia Pictures, starring Krazy Kat. The film also marks the debut of Krazy's second theme song which would have a much longer run than his first.

Plot
At a harbor, a paddle steamer carrying popular stage performers arrives. One of the performers is a girl cockapoo whom Krazy suddenly falls in love with. Krazy goes on to serenade her with a banjo. Momentarily a hippo, who is also in love with her, also comes by.

A show opens at a theater, and starts with an orchestra playing "Alexander's Ragtime Band". The second act features a pack of hens doing can can, and twirling muskets.

Most of the spectators watch from the stands. Krazy, for some reason, watches from a balcony that's meant for special guests. The hippo too watches from a balcony which is on the other side of the stands.

The third and final act features the girl cockapoo. She sings a non-verbal song but her gestures suggest she desperately wants someone to love her. From their balconies, Krazy and the hippo express their submission in body language. The two guys continue until they drop onto the stage. When the song ends, it appears the girl cockapoo belongs to a boy hedgehog who escorts her out of the stage, much to the surprise of Krazy and the hippo. They are even further surprised when the audience gazes at them before laughing.

The hippo tries to entertain the crowd by doing a little ballet. Krazy does not want him to have the spotlight as the cat plucks the buttons from the hippo's trousers. The trousers come down, and the hippo leaves in a blush. Krazy takes over the limelight in doing some tap dancing. The hippo decides to get back at Krazy by hurling a banana peel onto the stage. Krazy manages to stay of foot for several seconds but still ends up lying flat. As a double whammy for the cat, Krazy gets pelted with objects from the spectators.

See also
 Krazy Kat filmography

References

External links
Slow Beau at the Big Cartoon Database
 

1930 films
American black-and-white films
Krazy Kat shorts
Columbia Pictures short films
1930s American animated films
1930 animated films
American animated short films
Columbia Pictures animated short films
Screen Gems short films